Gran Madre di Dio (Great Mother of God) is a cardinal's titular church in Rome. Its current holder is Angelo Bagnasco, Archbishop of Genoa, who was created a cardinal on 24 November 2007. The church was established as a titular church in 1965.
The monumental temple was built by Pope Pius XI in 1931, in memory of the celebrations held to commemorate the 1,500 anniversary of the Council of Ephesus, which established the dogma of the divine motherhood and her perpetual virginity of Mary, in the patristic tradition and popular devotion since From the Church. It was built between 1931 and 1933 by architect Cesare Bazzani, built by Clemente Busiri Vici. It is the seat of the parish of the same name, erected by Pius XI on 1 December 1933, the year of Jubilee extraordinary redemption, in the Apostolic Constitution "Quo perennius" .

Description
Exterior

The main entrance is preceded by a portico with a triangular pediment supported by two columns with Corinthian capitals and side pillars. Within the pediment is the coat of arms of Pope Pius XI; There are also two side entrances that open into two bodies of curvilinear factory, placed at the side of the porch. Two small lateral bell towers, each topped with flank the large dome resting on an octagonal drum and is topped by a lantern, also octagonal. In the drum they are opened eight large rectangular windows, one per side.

Interior

The church has a Greek cross plan. semicircular apse has five arched windows, above which, within a frame, is the inscription SANCTA MARIA MATER DEI ORA PRO NOBIS (Holy Mary, Mother of God, pray for us). In the apse there is a fresco of the painter Federico Morgante.

List of Cardinal Protectors
Agnelo Rossi 22 Feb 1965 appointed - 25 Jun 1984 appointed Cardinal-Bishop of Sabina e Poggio Mirteto
Angel Suquía Goicoechea 25 May 1985 appointed - 13 Jul 2006 died
Angelo Bagnasco 24 November 2007 appointed - present

References
Pope Paul VI established it as titular church

External links
Gran Madre di Dio

Roman Catholic churches completed in 1933
Titular churches
Rome Q. XV Della Vittoria
20th-century Roman Catholic church buildings in Italy